Vasily Ermolaevich Ruzhentsev (April 4, 1899 - October 12, 1978) was a Soviet paleontologist, malacologist and geologist. From 1937 to 1978 he worked at the Paleontological Institute of Russian Academy of Sciences. He had 117 publications of which 17 were monographs. From 1966 to 1978 he was editor in chief of the Transactions of the Paleontological Institute.

Sources
 Leonova, T.P. (2009) ВАСИЛИЙ ЕРМОЛАЕВИЧ РУЖЕНЦЕВ ‒ 110 ЛЕТСО ДНЯ РОЖДЕНИЯ In: Современные проблемы изучения головоногих моллюсков. Морфология, систематика, эволюция, экология и биостратиграфия.  - Russian Academy of Sciences (Jubilee symposium volume)

1899 births
1978 deaths
Lenin Prize winners
Soviet geologists
Soviet malacologists
Soviet paleontologists
Paleontological Journal editors